Kushkak Rural District is in Qohestan District of Darmian County, South Khorasan province, Iran. It was separated from Qohestan Rural District after the 2016 National Census. Its capital is the village of Kushkak, whose population at the census was 877 people in 277 households.

References 

Darmian County

Rural Districts of South Khorasan Province

Populated places in South Khorasan Province

Populated places in Darmian County

fa:دهستان کوشکک